Lucia Haro (born 21 August 1986) is an Argentine handball player. She plays for Unión Eléctrica and defended Argentina at the 2011 World Women's Handball Championship in Brazil.

References

External links

1986 births
Living people
Argentine female handball players
Handball players at the 2016 Summer Olympics
Olympic handball players of Argentina
Handball players at the 2007 Pan American Games
Handball players at the 2011 Pan American Games
Handball players at the 2015 Pan American Games
Pan American Games medalists in handball
Pan American Games silver medalists for Argentina
Pan American Games bronze medalists for Argentina
Medalists at the 2015 Pan American Games
Medalists at the 2011 Pan American Games
20th-century Argentine women
21st-century Argentine women